Mansoor Akhtar (born 25 December 1957) is a Pakistani former cricketer who played in 19 Test matches and 41 One Day Internationals between 1980 and 1990. In his Test career Mansoor scored one century and three half-centuries, with a highest score of 111 against Australia in Faisalabad. In his ODI career he failed to even record a half century and took only two wickets.

At the age of only 19 he partnered Waheed Mirza in a world record opening stand of 561 on 7 and 8 February 1977 while playing for Karachi Whites against Quetta at National Stadium, Karachi. The partnership is still the best for the first wicket in first-class cricket, and took just six and a half hours.

On 7 August 2019, Mansoor Akhtar, along with one other person named Ramesh Gupta from India, was alleged to have approached Pakistani cricketer Umar Akmal for match fixing during the second edition of the Global T20 Canada tournament. Akmal, however, reported the approach to the Pakistan Cricket Board and tournament officials. Anti-corruption officials instructed all participating teams to stay away from Akhtar and Ramesh Gupta. Mansoor Akhtar has admitted meeting Umar Akmal, but hasn't admitted to the allegations of fixing.

References

  

1957 births
Living people
Mansoor Akhtar
Mansoor Akhtar
Cricketers at the 1983 Cricket World Cup
Cricketers at the 1987 Cricket World Cup
Pakistani cricketers
Karachi Whites cricketers
Karachi Blues cricketers
Sindh cricketers
Sind A cricketers
Karachi B cricketers
United Bank Limited cricketers
Karachi cricketers
Habib Bank Limited cricketers
Cricketers from Karachi
Pakistani cricket coaches